Francisco Solís Hervás, O. de M. (1657–1716) was a Roman Catholic prelate who served as Bishop of Córdoba (1714–1716) 
and Bishop of Lérida (1701–1713).

Biography
Francisco Solís Hervás was born in Gibraltar in 1657 and ordained a priest in the Order of the Blessed Virgin Mary of Mercy in 1674.
On 8 August 1701, he was appointed during the papacy of Pope Clement XI as Bishop of Lérida.
On 21 December 1701, he was consecrated bishop by Francesco Acquaviva d'Aragona, Titular Archbishop of Larissa in Thessalia. 
On 22 June 1713, he was selected by the King of Spain as Bishop of Sigüenza but was not yet confirmed by the pope before being selected as Bishop of Córdoba and confirmed by Pope Clement XI on 17 January 1714.
He served as Bishop of Córdoba until his death on 14 October 1716.

Episcopal succession
While bishop, he was the principal consecrator of:
Juan José Llamas Rivas, Bishop of Panamá (1714);
and the principal co-consecrator of:
Carlos Borja Centellas y Ponce de León, Titular Archbishop of Trapezus (1705);
Pedro Aguado, Bishop of Pamplona (1713); and
Sancho Antonio Belunza Corcuera, Bishop of Ceuta (1714).

References

External links and additional sources
 (for Chronology of Bishops) 
 (for Chronology of Bishops) 
 (for Chronology of Bishops) 
 (for Chronology of Bishops) 

18th-century Roman Catholic bishops in Spain
Bishops appointed by Pope Clement XI
1657 births
1716 deaths
Spanish people from Gibraltar
Mercedarian bishops